Charlie Chalk is a British stop motion animation series produced in 1987 in the United Kingdom by Woodland Animations, who also produced the children's television programmes Postman Pat, Gran, and Bertha. Reception to the show was mostly positive. The series began airing from 20 October 1988, Thursday afternoons on BBC1 part of Children's BBC for the first 10 episodes. The remaining three episodes of the series aired on BBC2 in a lunchtime slot.

Synopsis
The series tells the story of Charlie Chalk – a jolly clown who, after falling asleep whilst fishing out at sea, ends up on a strange island by the name of Merrytwit (as explained in the title sequence before each episode). Characters had to be aware of coconuts which constantly fell from the trees on the island.

The pilot episode of the series (entitled 'Shipwrecked Charlie') finds Charlie having just landed on Merrytwit, and after making friends with some of its inhabitants, decides to stay and build a home there. The following episodes follow Charlie and his new friends on various adventures on the island.

Main characters
 Charlie Chalk: A good natured and friendly peaceful clown, he was out on a fishing trip, when he ended up on Merrytwit Island. In the theme tune, he is described as having "a funny way of walking and a wacky way of chalking". He was voiced by Michael Williams. His 'funny way of walking' is demonstrated when on occasion he tumbles in an acrobatic circus-style through frames, around obstacles, or just to show folks how happy he is. He also has the ability to do magic tricks.
 Captain Mildred: The boss of the island (a parody of Margaret Thatcher), who loves to see everyone hard at work and has the practice of listing things that have to be done: "a: do this; b: do that" etc. She lives on the beached ship Buttercup.
 Mary the Hover Fairy: An old fairy who often proves useful due to her ability to cast spells, provided her magic wand, Houdini, has not wandered off again. She is getting old, so has decided to settle down on Merrytwit. She now lives on Buttercup, serving as Mildred's first mate.
 Lewis T. Duck: A small duck with a short temper. He is full of ideas, and believes them to be the best, so is quick to inform people that he is "always right". He can be quite friendly but lacks patience. The 'T' stands for 'The'.
 Arnold the Elephant: A pink elephant, who is quite jolly, but also very clumsy, much to the annoyance of Lewis, who always seems to be on the receiving end of Arnold's bouts of clumsiness.
 Edward: A monkey who spends his time sleeping and has quite a dislike for work.
 Trader Jones: Trader is the island's odd job man. Not only does he drive a bike which acts as a taxi and a means of transporting goods, he also owns a general supplies store on the island: 'if you want it, he's got it.' He never accepts money, he only trades e.g. a supply of bananas may cost a day's beachcombing.
 Bert: An ogre, discovered by Charlie, Arnold and Lewis in the episode The Mountain that Moaned. He lives inside a cave, and whilst an extremely friendly ogre, he is quite lacking in intelligence.
 Litterbug: A tiny little bug who is kept busy tidying up litter around the island. He often complains about the amount of litter, but does not realise there would be far less litter if his sack did not have a hole in it. Being so tiny, he is not always noticed, a fact which further frustrates him.

Episodes
The series consisted of 13 original episodes, as listed below:

Merchandise

UK VHS releases
All 13 episodes were released on three BBC Videos in the UK between 1988 and 1991.

Then, in 1995, Tempo Video released 9 episodes on VHS.

Finally, from 1999 to 2000, Contender Entertainment released 9 episodes on VHS on their "Nippers" label.

Other Merchandise
 Charlie Chalk – The Complete Series features all 13 episodes and is currently available in the UK on a single DVD release. It was made by Entertainment Rights plc and distributed by Universal Pictures in 2005.
 In 1994, Redrock Records released a Charlie Chalk LP. It included the several incidental songs played on the show and the full Charlie Chalk theme song which includes some previously unheard lyrics.
 A new Charlie Chalk CD has been developed in America.
 The UK based restaurant chain Brewers Fayre originally used Charlie Chalk as their mascot.
 Charlie Chalk Fun Factory was a play area for little kids, found in large Pubs across the United Kingdom, now only found around Aberdeen.

Broadcast
 The series originally first aired on BBC1 in the UK on 20 October 1988 until 22 December 1988 for the first 10 episodes then moved to BBC2 for the remaining three.
It later aired on cable television being shown on Sky One as part of The DJ Kat Show and later on The Children's Channel as part of their block for preschoolers Tiny TCC.
 The series was later sold to broadcast in various countries around the world such as ABC in Australia, YTV in Canada, RTÉ One and RTÉ Two in the Irish Republic, TVNZ 1 and TVNZ 2 in New Zealand, TVB in Hong Kong and NRK in Norway.
 The series was dubbed in Scottish Gaelic and broadcast under the title Callum an Cailc by BBC Scotland.

Voice cast
 Michael Williams as Charlie Chalk, Lewis T. Duck, Trader Jones, Litterbug, and Rabbit
 Barbara Leigh-Hunt as Captain Mildred, Mary the Hover Fairy, and Ponka the Toucan
 John Wells as Arnold the Elephant, Edward, and Bert
 Ken Barrie as Song vocals
 Joan Baxter as Song vocals
 Mike Redway as Song vocals

References

External links 
 

BBC children's television shows
British stop-motion animated television series
1980s British children's television series
1988 British television series debuts
1989 British television series endings
English-language television shows
Television series by Universal Television
DreamWorks Classics
Fictional castaways
Fictional clowns
1980s British animated television series
Television shows about clowns